"Nobody's Angel" is a song recorded by American country music artist Crystal Gayle.  It was released in August 1988 as the first single and title track from the album Nobody's Angel.  The song reached #22 on the Billboard Hot Country Singles & Tracks chart.  The song was written by Karen Brooks and Randy Sharp. To date, it is Gayle's last single to achieve moderate chart success.

Chart performance

References

1988 singles
1988 songs
Crystal Gayle songs
Songs written by Karen Brooks
Songs written by Randy Sharp
Song recordings produced by Jim Ed Norman
Warner Records singles